Porangaba is a municipality in the state of São Paulo in Brazil. The population is 10,067 (2020 est.) in an area of 266 km2.

References

Municipalities in São Paulo (state)